The 2017 Conference USA men's basketball tournament was held March 8–11, 2017, in Birmingham, Alabama, at Legacy Arena. Middle Tennessee received the conference automatic bid to the 2017 NCAA tournament with an 83-72 win over Marshall in the finals.

Seeds
Only 12 conference teams are eligible for the tournament. As a result, the top 4 teams receive a bye to the quarterfinals of the tournament.

Teams are seeded by record within the conference, with a tiebreaker system to seed teams with identical conference records.

Schedule
Rankings denote tournament seed.

Bracket

See also
 2017 Conference USA women's basketball tournament

References

Tournament
Conference USA men's basketball tournament
College sports tournaments in Alabama
Basketball competitions in Birmingham, Alabama
Conference USA men's basketball tournament
Conference USA men's basketball tournament